The Llandudno Cable Car is an attraction in the seaside resort of Llandudno in Conwy County Borough, Wales. The cable car runs along the Great Orme spanning a distance of  exactly. The cable car was opened in summer 1969, and has been operational ever since. The cabins give views of the Irish Sea looking over to Rhyl and the Isle of Man, as well as the Snowdonia National Park. There are currently 20 cabins in service, which leave each station at approximately one-minute intervals. The cabins are painted in red, yellow, orange, light blue and purple. Nine pylons support the cable.

Location 
The lower station is situated on Aberdeen Hill in Happy Valley Gardens. The station is visible from the promenade and Llandudno Pier. Access, via some steps, is not suitable for wheelchair users. The upper station is next to the actual summit of the Great Orme. The cable car is visible from many locations surrounding Llandudno.

Weather restrictions 
The cable car cannot operate in wind speeds of over  because of safety restrictions. It is often much calmer in Happy Valley but the wind is unpredictable at the summit, resulting in closures which may last a few minutes or a whole day. The cable cars also cannot operate in thunderstorms and might close if rain is too heavy.

The cable cars normally operate from the beginning of the Easter holidays to the end of the October half-term school holiday.

Incidents 
On 6 April 2007, a 33-year-old Polish woman fell to her death from a gondola at the route's highest point.  A subsequent inquest recorded a verdict of suicide.

See also
Great Orme Tramway

References

Transport in Conwy County Borough
Gondola lifts in the United Kingdom
Tourist attractions in Conwy County Borough
Llandudno
Transport infrastructure completed in 1969
1969 establishments in Wales